Paul Pratt (25 November 1894 – 8 May 1967) was a Canadian clarinetist, pianist, conductor, music educator, composer, and public administrator. His compositional output includes marches, waltzes, a Fantaisie-Impromptu for band, and some works for solo piano.

Life and career
Born in Longueuil, Pratt studied in his native city before moving to Montreal where he was a pupil of Orpha-F. Deveaux, and François Héraly (clarinet) at the Conservatoire national de musique. He earned a lauréat diploma in the clarinet from the conservatoire in 1912. In 1913 he joined the music faculty of the Collège de Longueuil where he taught courses in piano and clarinet and conducted the college's orchestra and band until 1920. During these years he also served as the Longueuil Concert Society's orchestra conductor and bandmaster, and taught solfège at the Société St-Jean-Baptiste.

Pratt was a clarinetist in the Symphonie Dubois in 1916–1917 and in the Canadian Grenadier Guards Band from 1919 to 1939. He was the Montreal Orchestra's bass clarinetist from 1931 to 1941 and played the contrabass clarinet for the CSM orchestra from 1935 to 1946. He also played the clarinet in the Little Symphony of Montreal and the Van der Meerschen band in St-Lambert. From 1950 to 1967 he was music director of the Metropolitan Concert Band of Montreal and from 1956 to 1957 he was president of the Canadian Band Association's Quebec and Ontario divisions. He also served for some years as the music director of the South Shore Band of Longueuil and the Gais Longueuillois Quartet.

In 1935 Pratt was elected the mayor of Longueuil. He enjoyed wide popularity in that post, and remained mayor for the next 31 years, stepping down in 1966. He was decorated twice while in office, once by George V the United Kingdom in 1935 and once by George VI of the United Kingdom in 1939, the latter for his activities in the War Campaign. He died in Longueuil in 1967 at the age of 72.

References

1894 births
1967 deaths
Canadian clarinetists
Canadian classical pianists
Male classical pianists
Canadian male composers
Male conductors (music)
Conservatoire national de musique alumni
Mayors of Longueuil
20th-century Canadian conductors (music)
20th-century Canadian composers
20th-century classical pianists
20th-century Canadian pianists
Canadian male pianists
20th-century Canadian male musicians
Canadian military musicians